The Mary Lyons Award is awarded annually to the women's volleyball player of the year in U Sports (previously named Canadian Interuniversity Sport). The award is named after Mary Lyons who served as president of the Ontario-Quebec Women’s Conference Intercollegiate Association (OQWCIA) and the Ontario Women’s Intercollegiate Athletic Association (OWIAA), and as a director of the Canadian Women's Interuniversity Athletic Union (CWIAU) and the Canadian Interuniversity Athletic Union (CIAU). Lyons, a graduate of Queen's University and the State University of New York, also served as Co-ordinator of Women's Interuniversity Athletics at York University for 26 years and coached the York Yeowomen volleyball team for seven years.

Eight players have won the award multiple times, but no player has claimed the award more than twice. The Winnipeg Wesmen program has featured the most winners of the award, with nine, including the most consecutive winners with seven from 1983 to 1989. Following the cancellation of the 2020-21 season due to the COVID-19 pandemic, there was no award winner in 2021.

List of winners

References

External links
 

U Sports trophies
U Sports volleyball